Cazalla de la Sierra is a small town in the province of Seville, in southern Spain.  It is located in the foothills of the Sierra Norte de Sevilla, part of the Sierra Morena, which acts as a border between the region of Andalusia and the regions of Extremadura and Castilla-La Mancha.

The local speech of Cazalla, like that of the province's capital but unlike most of the province itself, exhibits seseo.

References

External links
  Cazalla statistics

Municipalities of the Province of Seville